Kalana Wijesiri (born 10 September 2000) is a Sri Lankan cricketer. He made his List A debut on 28 March 2021, for Sri Lanka Air Force Sports Club in the 2020–21 Major Clubs Limited Over Tournament. He made his Twenty20 debut on 22 May 2022, for Sri Lanka Air Force Sports Club in the Major Clubs T20 Tournament.

References

External links
 

2000 births
Living people
Sri Lankan cricketers
Sri Lanka Air Force Sports Club cricketers
Place of birth missing (living people)